Jean-Marie Fortier (July 1, 1920 – October 31, 2002) was a Canadian Roman Catholic priest, Bishop of Gaspé, and Archbishop of Sherbrooke.

Born in Quebec City, Quebec, Fortier was ordained a priest in 1944. In 1960, he was appointed Titular Bishop of Pomaria and Auxiliary Bishop of Sainte-Anne-de-la-Pocatière, Québec. In 1965, he was appointed Bishop of Gaspé and was made Archbishop of Sherbrooke in 1968. He retired in 1996 and died in 2002.

Notes

1920 births
2002 deaths
20th-century Roman Catholic archbishops in Canada
Roman Catholic archbishops of Sherbrooke
French Quebecers
Participants in the Second Vatican Council
People from Quebec City
Roman Catholic bishops of Gaspé